The International Harp Contest in Israel is a harp competition. Founded in 1959 by Aharon Zvi Propes in the city of Jerusalem, it was the first competition for the harp in the history of the instrument.

Past competitions winners
1959
 1st prize: Susanna Mildonian, Belgium

1962
 1st prize: Lynn Turner, United States
 Special prize for best performance of Toccata composed by Ami Maayani: Bogumila Lutak, Poland

1965
 1st prize: Martine Géliot, France

1970
 1st prize: Chantal Mathieu, France

1973
 1st prize: Nancy Allen, United States

1976
 1st prize: Ivan Ion Roncea, Romania

1979
 1st prize: Emily Mitchell, United States

1982
 1st prize: Alice Giles, Australia

1985
 1st prize: Naoko Yoshino, Japan

1988
 1st prize: Isabelle Moretti, France

1992
 1st prize: Marie-Pierre Langlamet, France

1994
 1st prize: not awarded

1998
 1st prize: Gwyneth Wentink, Netherlands
 2nd prize: Christina Bianchi, Italy
 3rd prize: Kyo-Jin Lee, Korea

2001
 1st prize: Letizia Belmondo, Italy
 2nd prize: Jessica Li Zhou, China
 3rd prize: Lavinia Meijer, Netherlands

2003
 1st prize: Varvara Ivanova, Russia
 2nd prize: Julie Bunzel, Israel
 3rd prize: Albane Mahe, France
 Gulbenkian prize: Etsuko Shoiji, Japan
 Israeli Composition prize: Julie Bunzel, Israel
 Contemporary Piece prize: Varvara Ivanova, Russia
 Chamber Music prize: Julie Bunzel, Israel

2006
 1st prize: Sivan Magen, Israel
 2nd prize: Cécile Maudire, France
 3rd prize: Etsuko Chida, Japan
 Israeli Composition prize: Sivan Magen, Israel
 Contemporary piece prize: Cécile Maudire, France
 Mario Falcao prize: Teresa Zimmermann, Germany
 Renie prize: Sivan Magen, Israel

2009
 1st prize: not awarded
 2nd prize: Ina Zdorovetchi, Moldova
 3rd prize: Remy van Kesteren, Netherlands
 Chamber Music prize: Ina Zdorovetchi, Moldova
 Israeli Commissioned piece prize: Ina Zdorovetchi, Moldova
 Mario Falcao prize: Remy van Kesteren, Netherlands
 Renie prize: Emily Levin, United States

2012
1st prize: Anais Gaudemard, France
2nd prize: Agne Keblyte, Lithuania
3rd prize: Mai Fukui, Japan
Semi-Final Prize: In memory of Yona Ettinger: Anais Gaudemard, France
For best performance of R. Murray Schafer: The Crown of Ariadne: Anais Gaudemard, France
Aharon Zvi and Mara Propes Prize: Agne Keblyte
For best performance of Israeli composition by Zvi Avni, Fantasy for harp: Agne Keblite, Lithuania
Mario Falcao Prize: Mai Fukui, Japan
For best performance of a Free Choice Contemporary Work, in Stage II: Mai Fukui, Japan
Semi-Final Round Competitors
Maiko Enomoto, Japan
Mai Fukui, Japan
Anais Gaudemard, France
Agne Keblyte, Lithuania
Stefania Saglietti, Italy
Noël Wan, USA
Second Round Competitors
Bass, Elizabeth, UK
Enomoto, Maiko, Japan
Fukui, Mai, Japan
Gaudemard, Anais, France
Gott, Michelle, USA
Guiraud, Alexandra, France
Keblyte, Agne, Lithuania
Loei, Yi-Yun, Australia
Panizza, Martino, Italy
Saglietti, Stefania, Italy
Sidyagina, Oksana, Russia
Vernia, Inbar, Israel
Wan, Noel, USA
Yoon, Jane, USA
Second Round Repertoire:
Légende, Henriette Renié
Prélude, André Jolivet
Choice of Sonata:
Dalvimare
Viotti
Marin 
Free choice contemporary (to be written after 1985)
First Round Competitors:
Alquati, Tatiana, Italy
Amstutz, Nathalie, Switzerland
Bass, Elizabeth, UK
Dimitrova, Denitza, Bulgaria
Enomoto, Maiko, Japan
Fukui, Mai, Japan
Galo-Place, Claire, France
Gaudemard, Anais, France
Gott, Michelle, USA
Guiraud, Alexandra, France
Keblyte, Agne, Lithuania
Loei, Yi-Yun, Australia
Montes, Mateo Cristina, Spain
Panizza, Martino, Italy
Saglietti, Stefania, Italy
Sato, Rieko, Japan
Scholten, Nick, The Netherlands
Shemesh, Sarah, Israel
Sidyagina, Oksana, Russia
Vernia, Inbar, Israel
Vreeburg, Liesbeth, The Netherlands
Wan, Noel, USA
Widi, Rama, Indonesia
Yoon, Jane, USA
Young, Tamara, UK
Zdorovetchi, Ina, Moldova
First Round Repertoire:
Sonata in G, Carl Philipp Emanuel Bach
Rhapsodie, Marcel Grandjany
Choice of Suite:
Suite for Harp, Benjamin Britten
Suite in Classic Style, Lynn Palmer
Suite pour Harpe, Jean Francaix
Fantasy for Harp, Tzvi Avni

2015
1st prize: Yuying Chen, China

2018

Winners

1st prize: Lenka Petrović, Serbia
2nd prize: Joel von Lerber, Switzerland
3rd prize: Marina Fradin, Israel

Semi-final prize:
 Alisa Sadikova, Russia
 Tjasha Gafner, Switzerland
 Tatiana Repnikova, Russia
Irina Kaganovsky prize: 
Lenka Petrović, Serbia
Joel von Lerber, Switzerland
Nadja Dornik, Serbia
Mario Falcao Prize: Joan Rafaelle Kim, USA
Ropes prize: Joel von Lerber, Switzerland

External links 

Harp competitions
Entertainment events in Israel
Culture of Jerusalem
Music competitions in Israel